Whirl may refer to:
Spinning 
 Whirling, a dance genre
 Whirl (Transformers), a character in the Transformers franchise
 Tilt-A-Whirl, a type of amusement ride
 Atomic whirl, a symbol of atheism
 Whirl magazine, a luxury lifestyle magazine in Pittsburgh, PA
 Whirr (band), an American rock band that originally formed under the name Whirl

See also
 Whirlpool
 Whorl